Sam Maunder (born 22 March 2000) is an English professional rugby union player who plays as a scrum-half for Premiership Rugby club Exeter Chiefs. He also bench-warmed for Blundell’s 1st XV in the Champions Trophy Final in 2018.

References

External links

2000 births
Living people
English rugby union players
Exeter Chiefs players
Rugby union scrum-halves
Rugby union players from Exeter